The Talitsky mine is a large mine located in the Perm Krai. Talitsky represents one of the largest potash reserves in Russia having estimated reserves of 1.62 billion tonnes of ore grading 19.2% potassium chloride.

See also 
 List of mines in Russia

References 

Potash mines in Russia